1999–2000 Belarusian Cup was the ninth season of the Belarusian annual football cup competition. Contrary to the league season, it is conducted in a fall-spring rhythm. The first games were played on 18 July 1999.

Round of 32
The games were played on 18 and 20 July 1999. Three Premier League clubs (Molodechno, Lida, Torpedo-MAZ Minsk) received a bye to the next round by drawing of lots.

Round of 16
The games were played on 1 and 17 October 1999.

Quarterfinals
The games were played on 3 May 2000.

Semifinals
The games were played on 19 and 20 May 2000.

Final

External links
RSSSF

Belarusian Cup seasons
Belarusian Cup
Cup
Cup